Hawk Green is a suburb of Marple, Greater Manchester, England, on the Macclesfield Canal around a traditional village green. High Lane is to the south and Turf Lea to the east.

Just to the north of the centre of Hawk Green is Goyt Mill, a former cotton mill that now houses various businesses and recreational facilities, including a large indoor climbing wall. It was once home to the Frost family who, in 1823, except for their youngest daughter, Annie, died in a fire close to it. Charles Frost was a fantasy novelist.

Sport
Hawk Green Cricket Club is on Rhode Fields, off Upper Hibbert Lane. The 1st and 2nd XI senior teams compete in the Cheshire Cricket League, a Womans XI competes in the Cheshire Womans Cricket League  and a junior section plays in the Cheshire County Cricket League Junior Section.

References

Geography of the Metropolitan Borough of Stockport
Marple, Greater Manchester